Karl Groß (born 1881, date of death unknown) was an Austrian footballer. He played in three matches for the Austria national football team from 1907 to 1909.

References

External links
 

1881 births
Year of death missing
Austrian footballers
Austria international footballers
Place of birth missing
Association footballers not categorized by position